Ždiar (Goral: Zor) is a village and municipality in the Poprad District in the Prešov Region in Spiš in northern Slovakia.

History
In historical records the village was first mentioned in 1409. Its first name had been Stragan. Locals had been engaged in agriculture, pasturage and charcoal production. From the end of 19th century they began to be employed in tourism. It is a historically Goral village.

Geography
The municipality lies at an elevation of 896 meters at the base of the High Tatras and covers an area of 27.323 km². It has a population of about 1,340 people. 

The village is located about 3 km from the Polish border crossing and 34 km from Poprad.

Recreation
Ždiar is located at the base of Strednica alpine and cross country Ski resort. Several hiking trails into the High Tatras begin in the village.

References

External links
 Official website of Ždiar
 Tourist website of Ždiar

Spiš
Villages and municipalities in Poprad District
Ski areas and resorts in Slovakia